The following is a timeline of the history of the city of Hebron, West Bank, Palestinian territories.

Prior to 20th century

 990 BCE - Capital of David of Israel relocated from Hebron to Jerusalem (approximate date).
 164 BCE - Hebron sacked by forces of Judas Maccabeus.

 638 - Hebron taken by Muslim forces.
 1168 - Hebron taken by crusaders.
 1170 - Traveler Benjamin of Tudela visits city.
 1187 - Saladin in power.
 1270 - Sheikh Ali al-Bakka Mosque construction begins.
 1320 - Al-Jawali Mosque built.
 1326 - Traveler Ibn Battuta visits city.
 1517
 1517 Hebron pogrom.
 Ottomans in power.
 1540 - Abraham Avinu Synagogue built.
 1834 - Hebron sacked by Egyptian forces.
 1900 - Population: About 10,000.

20th century

 1922
 Hebron becomes part of the British Mandate of Palestine.
 Population: 16,500.
 1925 - Abraham's Oak Holy Trinity Monastery consecrated.
 1929 - 24 August: 1929 Hebron massacre.
 1943 - Shabab Al-Khalil SC (football team) formed.
 1948
 British Mandate of Palestine ends.
 Transjordan forces in power.

1960s-1990s

 1965 - Palestine Red Crescent Society branch established.
 1966 - Hebron the lamb is found in Tel Rumeida.
 1967 - June: Israeli occupation begins; Israeli Military Governorate established.
 1968 - Kiryat Arba Israeli settlement founded near city.
 1971 - Hebron University established.
 1976
 12 April: 1976 West Bank local elections held.
 Fahd Qawasmeh becomes mayor.
 1978 - Palestine Polytechnic University established.
 1983 - July: City council and mayor Mustafa Natshe ousted.
 1994
 25 February: Ibrahimi Mosque massacre.
 8 May: Temporary International Presence in Hebron begins.
 Al-Shuhada Street closed to Palestinians.
 Palestinian Child Arts Center founded.
 1996 - 20 January: 1996 Palestinian general election.
 1997
 16 January: Protocol Concerning the Redeployment in Hebron effected.
 Population: 119,801 (119,401 Palestinians + 400 Jewish settlers).

21st century

 2003 - Population: 154,714.
 2007
 Khaled Osaily becomes mayor.
 Abraham Path established.
 Jewish settlers occupy Rajabi House in H2.
 2012
 October: Municipal election held.
 Youth Against Settlements active (approximate date).
 2017 - Old Town of Hebron designated an UNESCO World Heritage Site.
 2018 - Population: 199,319 (estimate).

See also
 Hebron history (ar)
 Timeline of the history of the region of Palestine
 Timeline of Jerusalem

References

This article incorporates information from the French Wikipedia.

Bibliography

External links

 Europeana. Items related to Hebron, various dates.
  1993–present

Hebron
hebron
Hebron
State of Palestine-related lists
Hebron